Cell death-inducing DFFA-like effector b, also known as CIDEB, is a human gene.

In humans, individuals carrying rare loss of function mutations in the CIDEB gene are protected against different aetiologies of liver disease. CIDEB knockout mice have been generated by homolog recombination technique. The CIDE null mice show decreased lipogenesis.  The CIDEB knockout mice are resistant to high fat diet induced obesity and liver steatosis. In addition, the CIDEB null mice also have improved insulin sensitivity and enhanced hepatic fatty acid oxidation and whole body metabolism. CIDEB plays a key role in determining lipid droplet size: overexpression of CIDEB in vitro results in fat accumulation by inducing larger lipid droplets, while CIDEB knock-out experiments results in accumulation of smaller lipid droplets.

References

Further reading